Baharlar can refer to:

 Baharlar, Ayvacık
 Baharlar, Lice
 Baharlar, Tavas